High Flight Society is the self-titled debut album of  Christian rock band High Flight Society. It was released on June 5, 2007.

Track listing

Personnel 
 Jason Wilkes – lead vocals, rhythm guitar
 Michael Packer – lead guitar, backing vocals
 John Packer – bass guitar, backing vocals
 Scotty Lockridge – drums, percussion

References 

2007 debut albums
High Flight Society albums